Marcel Eichenberger (born 27 January 1960) is a Swiss sprint canoer who competed in the mid-1980s. He was eliminated in the semifinals of the K-4 1000 m event at the 1984 Summer Olympics in Los Angeles.

References
Sports-Reference.com profile

1960 births
Canoeists at the 1984 Summer Olympics
Living people
Olympic canoeists of Switzerland
Swiss male canoeists
Place of birth missing (living people)